Jiim Sheikh Muumin (born ) is a prominent Somalian musician and actor. He began performing when he was 17.  Prior to the Somali Civil War, he maintained a successful career in which he reached "rock star" status. , he has remained in Mogadishu in spite of local upheavals.

He is one of almost dozen composers who shaped the contemporary Somali Music, in the golden era of Somali Music (Late 60s to early 80s). He was the chief composer and tutor of Onkod Band. He has made a masterpieces of the Somali Music.

References 

Somalian musicians
Somalian male actors
1940s births
Living people